Maxine Brown may refer to:

Maxine Brown (country singer) (1931–2019), American country singer
Maxine Brown (soul singer) (born 1939), American soul singer
Maxine D. Brown, American computer scientist